The S5 is a railway service of the St. Gallen S-Bahn that provides hourly or better service between  and , in the Swiss cantons of St. Gallen and Thurgau. THURBO, a joint venture of Swiss Federal Railways and the canton of Thurgau, operates the service.

Operations 
It uses the Winterthur–Romanshorn line on the section between Weinfelden and Sulgen, the Sulgen to Gossau line, the St. Gallen–Winterthur line between Gossau and St. Gallen, the Rorschach–St. Gallen line, and the Chur–Rorschach line between Rorschach and St. Margrethen.

Route 

  –  –  –  – 

 Weinfelden
 
 
 
 
 
 
 
 
 Gossau SG
 
 
 St. Gallen
 
 
 
 Rorschach
 
 
 St. Margrethen

History 
The relaunched St. Gallen S-Bahn kept this service pattern and designated the additional peak services S55. The December 2018 timetable change eliminated the S55; service between Weinfelden and Bischofszell Stadt increased to half-hourly, with some of the additional trains continuing to St. Gallen.

The S5 was extended to St. Margrethen in December 2021, replacing the S3.

References

External links 

 Fahrplan Ost

St. Gallen S-Bahn lines
Transport in the canton of St. Gallen
Transport in Thurgau